Tillandsia loliacea is a plant species in the genus Tillandsia. This species is native to Bolivia, Paraguay, Argentina, and Brazil.

References

loliacea
Flora of South America
Plants described in 1830